Ashley Fickling  (born 15 November 1972) is an English former professional footballer and current football physiotherapist.

As a player, he was a defender who played between 1991 and 2002 notably for Grimsby Town. He also had spells with Sheffield United, Darlington, Scunthorpe United and Scarborough. Since retirement he has made his trade in the sport as a  Physiotherapist and was formerly the head physio of Sheffield Wednesday.

Playing career
Fickling started his career at his home town club of Sheffield United. He struggled to make an impact at Bramall Lane and made only six appearances in total between 1991 and 1995, incidentally none of them were league games. While with United, Fickling spent two spells on loan with Darlington.

In March 1995 he signed on a free transfer with fellow English First Division club Grimsby Town. While at the club, he struggled to make an impact under managers Brian Laws and Alan Buckley, and following another loan with Darlington, he was released and signed for Scunthorpe United in May 1998.

Fickling remained with The Iron until 2001, where he moved briefly to play for Scarborough before retiring from the game due to injury problems.

Physiotherapist
Upon retirement, Fickling trained to be a sports physiotherapist, completing his bachelor's degree at the University of Salford and joined Sheffield Wednesday in 2007.

External links

Ashley Fickling profile at thefishy.co.uk

1972 births
Living people
Footballers from Sheffield
English footballers
Sheffield United F.C. players
Darlington F.C. players
Grimsby Town F.C. players
Scunthorpe United F.C. players
Scarborough F.C. players
English Football League players
Association football physiotherapists
Alumni of the University of Salford
Sheffield Wednesday F.C. non-playing staff
Association football defenders